is a Japanese retired ice hockey player and the head coach for the Japanese women's national ice hockey team.  He coached the team at the 2019 IIHF Women's World Championship and the 2022 Winter Olympics.

References

External links

1974 births
Living people
Japanese expatriate ice hockey people
Japanese expatriate sportspeople in Russia
Japanese ice hockey forwards
Japanese ice hockey coaches
Oji Eagles players
Expatriate ice hockey players in Russia